Baxter is an unincorporated community in Jefferson County, in the U.S. state of Pennsylvania.

History
A post office was established at Baxter in 1875, and remained in operation until 1967. The community was named for Richard J. Baxter, who owned a sawmill there.

References

Unincorporated communities in Jefferson County, Pennsylvania
Unincorporated communities in Pennsylvania